Ed Gataveckas (born December 29, 1957) was a linebacker who played ten seasons in the Canadian Football League for the Hamilton Tiger-Cats. He was a part of the Tiger-Cats 1986 Grey Cup winning team. He was a teacher at Meadowvale Secondary School until his retirement in 2016. In 2018 Gataveckas made his acting debut in the comedy horror film "The Hoard".

References

External links
CFL Bio

1957 births
Acadia Axemen football players
Canadian football linebackers
Hamilton Tiger-Cats players
Living people
Players of Canadian football from Ontario
Canadian football people from Toronto